The apex of the posterior grey column, one of the three grey columns of the spinal cord, is capped by a V-shaped or crescentic mass of translucent, gelatinous neuroglia, termed the substantia gelatinosa of Rolando (or SGR) (or gelatinous substance of posterior horn of spinal cord), which contains both neuroglia cells, and small nerve cells.  The gelatinous appearance is due to a very low concentration of myelinated fibers.  It extends the entire length of the spinal cord and into the medulla oblongata where it becomes the spinal nucleus of the trigeminal nerve.

It is named after Luigi Rolando.

It corresponds to Rexed lamina II.

Structure 
The SGR, or lamina II, is composed of an outer lamina II and an inner lamina II.  In rodents, the inner lamina II is divided into a dorsal and ventral inner lamina II. The distinction between these laminae lies in the areas of the spinal cord that send information to and from the laminae (input and output projections).

The cell types within the SGR include islet cells, central cells, stalked or large vertical cells, small vertical cells, and radial cells. The islet cells and small vertical cells are primarily GABAergic, while the large vertical cells and radial cells are primarily glutamatergic. The descriptors GABAergic and glutamatergic refer to the neurotransmitter (GABA and glutamate, respectively) that the cell releases. Typically, the release of GABA from one cell causes the next cell to stop firing. The release of glutamate typically causes the next cell to depolarize and fire. Central cells can be either glutamatergic or GABAergic. These cells synapse on each other to modulate pain signaling through the release of these different neurotransmitters and various neuropeptides.

The cells in the SGR receive input from each other and primary afferent neurons and project outwards to other cells within the lamina. Complex circuits of excitation and inhibition lead to transmission and inhibition of pain signals through the spinal cord to the thalamus.

Function
The substantia gelatinosa is one point (the nucleus proprius being the other) where first order neurons of the spinothalamic tract synapse.

Many μ and κ-opioid receptors, presynaptic and postsynaptic, are found on these nerve cells; they can be targeted to manage pain of distal origin. For instance, neuraxial administration of opioids results in analgesia primarily by action in the dorsal horn of the spinal cord in the substantia gelatinosa where they inhibit release of excitatory neurotransmitters such as substance P and glutamate and inhibit afferent neural transmission to the brain from incoming peripheral pain neurons via hyperpolarization of postsynaptic neurons.

C fibers terminate at this layer. Thus, the cell bodies located here are part of the neural pathway conveying slowly conducting, poorly localized pain sensation. However, some A delta fibers (carrying fast, localized pain sensation) also terminate in the substantia gelatinosa, mostly via axons passing through this area to the nucleus proprius. Thus, there is cross talk between the two pain pathways.

C fibers carrying information about pain and temperature synapse in outer lamina II and dorsal inner lamina II and release glutamate to excite neurons in these regions. Some C fibers also release BDNF, which can be either excitatory or inhibitory, sometimes depending on the characteristics of the post-synaptic neuron. These fibers are part of a pathway which may be implicated in central sensitization in chronic pain conditions. Fibers synapsing on these laminae that release peptides SST and GDNF may be part of a pathway that inhibits pain signaling.

Some of the SGR projects to the posteromarginal nucleus of the spinal cord, or lamina I, and laminae III-V. Most of these projections are excitatory.

References

External links
 
 Diagram at Washington University in St. Louis

Spinal cord